In algebraic geometry, the normal cone of a subscheme of a scheme is a scheme analogous to the normal bundle or tubular neighborhood in differential geometry.

Definition

When the embedding i is regular the normal cone is the normal bundle, the vector bundle on X corresponding to the dual of the sheaf .

If X is a point, then the normal cone and the normal bundle to it are also called the tangent cone and the tangent space (Zariski tangent space) to the point. When Y = Spec R is affine, the definition means that the normal cone to X = Spec R/I is the Spec of the associated graded ring of R with respect to I.

If Y is the product X × X and the embedding i is the diagonal embedding, then the normal bundle to X in Y is the tangent bundle to X.

The normal cone (or rather its projective cousin) appears as a result of blow-up. Precisely, let

Thus,

Properties

Compositions of regular embeddings 
If  are regular embeddings, then  is a regular embedding and there is a natural exact sequence of vector bundles on X:

If  are regular embeddings of codimensions  and if  is a regular embedding of codimension  then

In particular, if  is a smooth morphism, then the normal bundle to the diagonal embedding  (r-fold) is the direct sum of  copies of the relative tangent bundle .

If  is a closed immersion and if  is a flat morphism such that , then

(which is a special case of an exact sequence for cotangent sheaves.)

Cartesian square 
For a Cartesian square of schemes  with  the vertical map, there is a closed embedding  of normal cones.

Dimension of components 
Let  be a scheme of finite type over a field and  a closed subscheme. (This can be seen as a consequence of #Deformation to the normal cone.)

Examples 
Let  be an effective Cartier divisor. Then the normal bundle to it (or equivalently the normal cone to it) is

Non-regular Embedding
Consider the non-regular embedding

then, we can compute the normal cone by first observing

If we make the auxiliary variables  and   we get the relation

We can use this to give a presentation of the normal cone as the relative spectrum

Since  is affine, we can just write out the relative spectrum as the affine scheme  giving us the normal cone.

Geometry of this normal cone 
Note that geometrically  is the union of the -plane  with the -axis ,  so the points of interest are smooth points on the plane, smooth points on the axis, and the point on their intersection. Since it's arbitrary which point we take, for convenience let's assume .

Nodal cubic 

Deformation to the normal cone
Suppose  is an embedding. This can be deformed to the embedding of  inside the normal cone  (as the zero section) in the following sense: there is a flat family  with generic fiber  and special fiber  such that there exists a family of closed embeddings  over  such that

 Over any point  the associated embeddings are an embedding 
 The fiber over is the embedding of  given by the zero section.

This construction defines a tool analogous to differential topology where non-transverse intersections are performed in a tubular neighborhood of the intersection.

Construction 
One application of this is to define intersection products in the Chow ring. Suppose that X and V are closed subschemes of Y with intersection W, and we wish to define the intersection product of X and V in the Chow ring of Y. Deformation to the normal cone in this case means that we replace the embeddings of X and W in Y and V by their normal cones CY(X) and CW(V), so that we want to find the product of X and CWV in CXY.
This can be much easier: for example, if X is regularly embedded in Y then its normal cone is a vector bundle, so we are reduced to the problem of finding the intersection product of a subscheme CWV of a vector bundle CXY with the zero section X. However this intersection product is just given by applying the Gysin isomorphism to CWV.

Concretely, the deformation to the normal cone can be constructed by means of blowup. Precisely, let

be the blow-up of  along .

Now, we note:
The map , the  followed by projection, is flat.
M is trivial away from zero; i.e.,  and  restricts to the trivial embedding 
  as the divisor is the sum  where  is the blow-up of Y along X and is viewed as an effective Cartier divisor.
Item 1 is clear (check torsion-free-ness). In general, given , we have .

yielding . Item 3 follows from the fact the blowdown map π is an isomorphism away from the center . The last two items are seen from explicit local computation. Q.E.D.

Thus, one gets the deformation of i to the zero-section embedding of X into the normal cone.

Intrinsic normal cone

Intrinsic normal bundle 
Let  be a Deligne–Mumford stack locally of finite type over a field . A concrete interpretation of this stack quotient can be given by looking at its behavior locally in the etale topos of the stack .

Properties of intrinsic normal bundle 
More concretely, suppose there is an étale morphism  from an affine finite-type -scheme  together with a locally closed immersion  into a smooth affine finite-type -scheme . Then one can show  meaning we can understand the intrinsic normal bundle as a stacky incarnation for the failure of the normal sequence  to be exact on the right hand side. Moreover, for special cases discussed below, we are now considering the quotient as a continuation of the previous sequence as a triangle in some triangulated category.

Normal cone 

Example: One has that  is a local complete intersection if and only if .

More generally, let  is a Deligne-Mumford Type (DM-type) morphism of Artin Stacks which is locally of finite type. Then  is characterised as the closed substack such that, for any étale map  for which  factors through some smooth map  (e.g.), the pullback is:

See also 
Abelian cone
Segre class
Residual intersection
Virtual fundamental class

Notes

References

External linkes 

 Fibers of the normal cone

Algebraic geometry
Intersection theory